KOB is a TV station, Albuquerque, New Mexico, US.

KOB or Kob may also refer to:
 Kob, an antelope found in Africa
 Kids Off the Block, a youth project in Chicago, United States
 KKOB (AM), previously KOB, a radio station in Albuquerque, New Mexico, US
 KOBQ, previously KOB-FM, a radio station in Albuquerque, New Mexico, US
 Kowloon Bay station, Hong Kong, MTR station code
Kop of Boulogne (KoB), kop stand of the Parc des Princes, the home of Paris Saint-Germain F.C.
Kevin O'Brien (cricketer), Irish cricketer
Kingdom of Bhutan
Kingdom of Bahrain